Michael Alfred Gartner (born October 29, 1959) is a Canadian former professional ice hockey right winger who played 19 seasons in the National Hockey League for the Washington Capitals, Minnesota North Stars, New York Rangers, Toronto Maple Leafs and Phoenix Coyotes. He also played one season in the defunct World Hockey Association for the Cincinnati Stingers. He was a two-time Canada Cup champion with Team Canada. 

In 2017 Gartner was named one of the 100 Greatest NHL Players in the league's 100-year history. Inducted into the Hockey Hall of Fame (HHOF) in 2001, Gartner has been a member of the HHOF Selection Committee since 2009, and its Chair since 2022.

Playing career
Gartner was born in Ottawa, Ontario. As a youth, Gartner played in the 1972 Quebec International Pee-Wee Hockey Tournament with a minor ice hockey team from Toronto.

Gartner was drafted in the 1st round, 4th overall, by the Washington Capitals in the 1979 NHL Entry Draft. He started his professional career in the WHA as an underager with the Cincinnati Stingers in 1978–79. He played on a line with Mark Messier and had a successful campaign, finishing second to Wayne Gretzky for Rookie-of-the-Year honors. With the WHA folding at the end of the season, he played the next season with the Capitals, and would play for them for the better part of ten seasons. He recorded an assist in his NHL debut on October 11, 1979, versus the Buffalo Sabres, and he wore number eleven for the Caps.

Gartner had a solid season in 1979–80, winning the Capitals' Rookie of the Year and MVP awards, as well as being voted by their fans as the team's Most Promising Player. He also led the team with 36 goals. Gartner was traded to the Minnesota North Stars on March 7, 1989, with Larry Murphy for Dino Ciccarelli and Bob Rouse. He left the Capitals as the team's all-time leader in career goals, assists and points, as of January 2017 he stands third in goals and points and fourth in assists.

However, Gartner only lasted one season with Minnesota and was traded to the New York Rangers on March 6, 1990, for Ulf Dahlén, a draft pick and future considerations. He had a strong start with the Rangers scoring two goals in his debut versus the Philadelphia Flyers. He scored eleven goals and sixteen points in the remaining twelve regular-season games the Rangers played that year. In 1991–92, he became the first player in NHL history to score his 500th goal, 500th assist, 1000th point and play in his 1000th game all in the same season. The next season, Gartner became the first Ranger to score at least 40 goals in three consecutive seasons. He also scored four goals in the NHL All-Star Game and earned the All-Star Game MVP award.

Gartner was traded to the Toronto Maple Leafs for Glenn Anderson, a minor leaguer, and a draft pick at the trade deadline on March 21, 1994. The deal was driven by Rangers head coach Mike Keenan who disliked Gartner for his lack of grit and disappointing performances in the playoffs. Rangers general manager Neil Smith convinced his Maple Leafs counterpart Cliff Fletcher to agree to the trade by noting that Gartner had one year left on his contract while Anderson was expected to become a free agent at season's end. Gartner played with the Leafs until 1996, when he was traded to the Phoenix Coyotes, who had just re-located from Winnipeg. Gartner scored the first goal and hat trick in Phoenix history on October 7 against the Boston Bruins, in the franchise's second game since relocation. He played two seasons with the Coyotes before retiring in August 1998.

Hockey administrator
Gartner was active with the NHL Players Association. He served as president of the NHLPA from 1996 until his retirement in 1998 and served as Chairman of the Goals & Dreams program with the NHLPA. He resigned from the NHLPA on March 19, 2007.

Gartner has been a member of the Hockey Hall of Fame Selection Committee in 2009, and its Chair since 2022.

Distinction
Despite his long impressive career, Gartner never won the Stanley Cup nor played in the Cup Finals, never won an NHL award, and was never named to the postseason All-Star Team, being one of the few NHL players with this distinction to be inducted into the Hockey Hall of Fame. Dino Ciccarelli likewise never managed any of these accolades, although he made the Cup Finals twice.

Gartner was a member of the New York Rangers team that would go on to win the championship in 1994, but he was traded to Toronto at the trade deadline. However, Gartner got farther than he ever would in the playoffs that same year, as the Maple Leafs made it to the Western Conference Finals before losing to the Vancouver Canucks in 5 games. He was traded close to the NHL trading deadline three times in his career, and had a knack for producing immediately for those teams, as in a combined 35 games with his new teams during the regular season after the mid-season deals, he had 24 goals, 18 assists, 42 points, and a +16 rating.

Gartner was noted for his consistency during his career, as he led his team in goals nine times during his career and scored 30 or more goals each year for the first 15 seasons of his NHL career, setting a record that has since been tied but not surpassed. Despite scoring 50 goals only once in a single season, Gartner became only the fifth player in NHL history to reach 700 goals.

Gartner was also known for his blazing on-ice speed and ability to beat defenders down the ice.

The Washington Capitals retired Gartner's #11 in a ceremony before their game against the Toronto Maple Leafs on December 28, 2008.

During the 1996 Super Skills competition, Gartner had set the record for the fastest skater event with a time of 13.386 (Full course standing start). The record stood for 20 years until Dylan Larkin of the Detroit Red Wings broke it with a skating/running start 2016. In the 2017 All-Star Game, Connor McDavid of the Edmonton Oilers set a time of 13.310 beating Gartner (standing start) but not Larkin (running start).

Awards and achievements

Jersey number #11 retired by Washington Capitals December 28, 2008.
One of only 8 players in NHL history to score 700 career goals.
2001 - Inducted into the Hockey Hall of Fame
2017 - Named to NHL's 100th anniversary list of the 100 Greatest NHL Players in history.
NHL's Player of the Week for the week ending February 22, 1987.
NHL's Player of the Month for February 1987, becoming first Capital to win the award.
NHL's Player of the Week for the week ending November 26, 1989.
NHL All-Star Game MVP (1993)
NHL's Fastest Skater at All-Star Game Skills Competition in (1991, 1993 and 1996)
Played in the NHL All-Star Game (1981, 1985, 1986, 1988, 1990, 1993, 1996)
One of the three final WHA players still active in professional hockey (Mark Messier and Wayne Gretzky being the last two) at the time of his retirement.
In 1998, he was ranked number 89 on [[List of 100 greatest hockey players by The Hockey News|The Hockey News''' list of the 100 Greatest Hockey Players]].
He scored the last goal ever at Chicago Stadium in the 1994 playoffs.
 In the 2009 book 100 Ranger Greats'', was ranked No. 67 all-time of the 901 New York Rangers who had played during the team's first 82 seasons
In 2012, he was inducted into the World Hockey Association Hall of Fame in the "Legends of the Game" category.

Records
NHL record for most consecutive 30-goal seasons - 15 (tied with Jaromir Jagr and Alexander Ovechkin)
NHL record for most 30-goal seasons - 17 (tied with Alexander Ovechkin) 
NHL record for most goals in an All-Star Game (1993) - 4 (shared with Wayne Gretzky, Dany Heatley and others)
NHL record for fastest two goals from the start of an All-Star Game (1993) - in 3:37
Washington Capitals record for longest point-streak - 17 games (twice)
Washington Capitals record for longest goal-scoring-streak (1986–87) - 9 games (shares record)
Washington Capitals record for most shorthanded goals in a season (1986–87) - 6 (shares record)
Washington Capitals record most points by a right winger in one season (1984–85) - 102

Career statistics

Regular season and playoffs

International

Personal life
Gartner and his wife Colleen have two sons, Joshua and Dylan, and a daughter Natalie. They reside in Shanty Bay, Ontario.

Gartner is a born-again Christian, and was introduced to the faith during his playing days by former Washington teammate Jean Pronovost. His son, Josh, played goalie for Yale University and right wing for the Tuck School of Business A-Team in the Upper Valley Hockey League.

Gartner and his former teammate, Wes Jarvis, are business partners and own three skating rinks in the Greater Toronto Area located in Newmarket, Ontario, Richmond Hill, Ontario, and Barrie, Ontario.

See also
 List of members of the Hockey Hall of Fame
 Hockey Hall of Fame
 Cincinnati Stingers
 List of NHL statistical leaders
 List of NHL players with 1000 points
 List of NHL players with 500 goals
 List of NHL players with 50 goal seasons
 List of NHL players with 100 point seasons

References

External links

Hockey Draft Central profile

1959 births
Living people
Canadian Christians
Canadian ice hockey right wingers
Cincinnati Stingers players
Canadian people of German descent
Hockey Hall of Fame inductees
Ice hockey people from Ottawa
Minnesota North Stars players
National Hockey League All-Stars
National Hockey League first-round draft picks
National Hockey League players with retired numbers
New York Rangers players
Niagara Falls Flyers players
Phoenix Coyotes players
St. Catharines Black Hawks players
Toronto Maple Leafs players
Washington Capitals draft picks
Washington Capitals players